Ron Ferguson (born 1986) is an American politician who is currently the Ohio state representative in Ohio's 96th district. He won the seat after incumbent Democrat Jack Cera became termlimited after completing his fourth term in 2020. He defeated Democrat Richard Olivito and Libertarian Oscar Herrera in 2020, winning 66.4% to 30.4% to 3.2%, thus flipping the district from Democratic to Republican.

Ferguson previously ran for this seat in 2014, but lost to Cera.

References

Living people
Republican Party members of the Ohio House of Representatives
21st-century American politicians
1986 births
People from Jefferson County, Ohio